Mirbah, formerly Murbah, is a coastal settlement in the emirate of Fujairah, United Arab Emirates (UAE).

Populated places in the Emirate of Fujairah